

Fender Princeton Reverb
The Fender Princeton Reverb is a guitar amplifier combo, essentially a Princeton with built-in reverb and vibrato. The 12 Watt Blackface version was introduced in 1964 and available until 1967; in 1968 it was changed to the Silverface version with a drip edge around the grill cloth. Amps produced after the end of 1969 saw a change in circuitry, the removal of the drip edge and a change in the rectifier from a 5AR4 to a 5U4GB along with a change in bias resistor value; a "boost" pull switch to the volume control pot was added in 1977. In 1980 and 1981 the Silverface version was cosmetically changed back to the Blackface. It was discontinued in 1981.

Fender Princeton Reverb II
This Paul Rivera-specified Fender guitar amplifier was introduced in 1982 to replace the Princeton Reverb. It was a completely different and significantly more powerful amplifier. Designed by Ed Jahns, it featured a built-in reverb, treble boost and mid boost controls, and a switchable lead (overdrive) effect. The Princeton Reverb II was removed from the Fender pricelist in 1986.

The development of the Princeton amplifier, from its inception as a 4-watt practice amp in 1948, can be tracked by working through http://ampwares.com attached to the sales website of the commercial firm "Mojotone".

Reissue
In Summer 2008, Fender reissued the Princeton Reverb. While it is based on the Blackface version, and utilizes a tube rectifier and a tube reverb, it uses printed circuit boards instead of eyelet-style hand-wired circuit boards.

'68 Custom
In Summer 2013, Fender released a redress of the Princeton Reverb reissue with slightly modified circuitry and the drip-edge "silverface" cosmetics introduced on Fender amplifiers in 1968. The model is known as the '68 Custom Princeton Reverb.

Specifications (Princeton Reverb, 1964–81)
Preamp tubes: one 7025, two 12AX7, one 12AT7
Output tubes: two 6V6GT, fixed-bias
Rectifier: 5AR4 (blackface & reissue), GZ34 (blackface), 5U4GB (silverface)
Controls: volume, treble, bass, reverb, speed, intensity
Output: 12 to 15 Watts RMS
Speaker: 10"  speaker (Jensen C10R, Jensen C10Q, Jensen C10N, Oxford 10L5 or Oxford 10J4)

Specifications (Princeton Reverb II, 1982–86)
Preamp tubes: three 7025 (a/k/a 12AX7), one 12AT7
Output tubes: two 6V6GTA, fixed-bias
Rectifier: solid-state
Controls: volume (pull for lead), treble (pull for boost), middle (pull for boost), bass, reverb, lead volume, master volume, presence
optional 2-button footswitch (lead, reverb)
Output: 22 Watts RMS
Speaker: 12" Fender Blue label made by Pyle and later re-sourced from Eminence; factory upgrade option for EV speaker

References

External links
 Princeton Reverb II, info for the "II" only, no other Princetons

P